The Agha Nour mosque is a mosque located in Isfahan, Iran. It was founded during the Shah Abbas I era and completed during the Shah Safi era, and as such the names of both kings were mentioned in the inscription above the portal of the mosque. The mosque was built under the supervision of Noureddin Mohammad Esfahani, who was one of the richest men in Isfahan. The Shabestan of this mosque is one of the most beautiful Shabestans in Isfahan. This Shabestan has stone pillars with marble arches, which provide light during the day.

See also 
List of the historical structures in the Isfahan province

References

External links 

16th-century mosques
Mosques in Isfahan